Micronations and the Search for Sovereignty is a non-fiction book written by Australian lawyers and legal academics Harry Hobbs and George Williams about micronations and their legal status within international law. It was published by Cambridge University Press as an ebook on 23 December 2021 and hardcover in January 2022. It received positive reviews for its legal take on micronations, and a follow-up, How to Rule Your Own Country: The Weird and Wonderful World of Micronations, was published by Hobbs and Williams in November 2022.

Context and publication 
Micronations and the Search for Sovereignty was authored by Australian lawyers and legal academics Harry Hobbs and George Williams. Both Hobbs and Williams have an expertise in international law. It is one of few works on micronational movements, and one of the earliest published books to focus largely on the legal aspects of micronations. It was published by Cambridge University Press as an ebook on 23 December 2021 and hardcover and paperback in January 2022. Published as part of Cambridge University Press's Cambridge Studies in Constitutional Law series edited by David Dyzenhaus and Thomas Poole, Micronations and the Search for Sovereignty is 256 pages in length. A follow-up, How to Rule Your Own Country: The Weird and Wonderful World of Micronations, was published by Hobbs and Williams in November 2022 by the University of New South Wales Press.

Content 
The book has six chapters, a preface, an appendix of micronations discussed, and a full index. The first chapter, "Prince Leonard Prepares for War," profiles several micronationalists and their reasonings for declaring independence. Chapter two, "Statehood and Micronations," concerns the definition of statehood within international law, legal recognition and attempted definitions of sovereignty such as the Montevideo Convention, with Hobbs and Williams concluding that the meaning of sovereignty is subjective. They note that micronation is not a legal term. The third chapter, "Motivations," expanding on chapter one, explores people's motivations for operating their own micronations and their influences.

Chapter four, "Performing Sovereignty," explores how micronations mimic sovereign states by creating their own coinage, passports, stamps and issuing titles of nobility. It also explores diplomacy between micronations and the intermicronational community as a whole. Chapter five, "State Responses," concerns the reactions to micronations by countries and world governments. Hobbs and Williams write that most micronations are ignored as they pose little threat to their country's sovereignty, while others that commit crimes, such as tax evasion, are dealt with in court as citizens rather than receiving any recognition as secessionist movements. In the sixth and final chapter, "The Future of Micronationalism," the authors explore the continued operation of micronations and other ethnic independence movements, as well as the continuation of the community.

Reception 
Vicente Bicudo de Castro, writing for Shima, lauded Micronations and the Search for Sovereignty and declared it "should be welcomed as a building block for research into micronations as it provides an in-depth examination of this phenomenon." He praised the book for offering a legal perspective on micronations he had not previously seen in other works, and was pleased that the book was nevertheless written in a "lively and accessible style, avoiding losing itself in technicalities and legal terminology," as well offering a definition of micronation that "narrows the subject matter and avoids conflations." De Castro did, however, criticise the sectionalisation of the chapters, noting that though "the chapters can be read as standalone pieces," some of the content thus became repetitive in certain parts.

Jack Corbett, reviewing the book for Small States & Territories, wrote that Micronations and the Search for Sovereignty is "another important contribution to the growing body of literature on the diversity of sovereign forms and the multiplicity of pathways to and types of statehood," however disliked that the work offered only a surface analysis on the definition of sovereignty while mostly implying the subjectivity of statehood.

On 15 August 2022, Hobbs gave an online seminar at the Australia National University's College of Law in which he discussed and summarised Micronations and the Search for Sovereignty.

See also 
 Micronations: The Lonely Planet Guide to Home-Made Nations (2006)

References

Sources

Primary sources

Bibliography

External links 

2021 non-fiction books
Cambridge University Press books
Works about micronations